Joseph Peter "Zip" Jaeger (March 3, 1895 – December 13, 1963) was a Major League Baseball pitcher who played in  with the Chicago Cubs. Jaeger began his Major League career on July 28, 1920 and played his final game on September 6, 1920.

References

External links

1895 births
1963 deaths
Major League Baseball pitchers
Baseball players from Minnesota
Chicago Cubs players